The Military Household of the Emperor (French: Maison Militaire de l'Empereur) was the immediate entourage of the Emperor of the French during the First French Empire. At the end of December 1806, no less than 800 men were members of the Military Household (200 for the saddle crew, 200 for the light crew and 400 for the harness crew). Three main functions were its main components:

Military and administrative functions:
Grand Marshal of the Palace, held by Generals Géraud Duroc, Armand de Caulaincourt and Henri Gatien Bertrand;
Grand Squire of France, exclusively held by General Caulaincourt;
The Chief of Staff of the Army (major général),  most notably held by Marshal Louis Alexandre Berthier;
the governor of the pages;
The Squire of the Empress.
Military Functions:
Generals without assignment who are available for temporary assignments;
the 7 aides-de-camp of the Emperor, who have their own aides-de-camp;
the 12 batmen of the Emperor, usually officers;
the Emperor's Cabinet;
the Private Secretariat;
the espionage service;
the archives service;
one translator-secretary;
the topographical bureau;
Civil Functions:
the Emperor's personal service:
the 4 menservants of the Emperor;
the administrator of the gardens;
the mameluke of the Emperor (Roustam Raza);
Other services:
the marshal of the palace;
the prefect of the palace;
the chamberlains;
the squires;
the surgeons;
the doctor;
the crown's payer;
the low-ranking personnel (menservants, cooks, grooms etc.)

References
Alain Pigeard, „Dictionnaire de la Grande Armée”, Tallandier, Bibliothèque Napoléonienne, 2004, p. 381-382.

 
First French Empire
Royal households